Holtålen is a municipality in Trøndelag county, Norway. It is part of the Gauldalen region. The administrative centre of the municipality is located in the Ålen area of the village of Renbygda. Other villages in the municipality include Hessdalen, Aunegrenda, and Haltdalen.

The  municipality is the 89th largest by area out of the 356 municipalities in Norway. Holtålen is the 283rd most populous municipality in Norway with a population of 1,953.

General information

The municipality of Holtaalen was established on 1 January 1838 (see formannskapsdistrikt law). In 1841, the western part of the municipality was separated to become the municipality of Singsaas. This left Holtaalen with 1,885 residents. Then in 1855, the southeastern part of Holtaalen was separated to become the municipality of Aalen, leaving Holtaalen with 809 residents. The spelling of the name was changed to Holtålen in 1921. In 1937, the name was changed from Holtålen to Haltdalen. On 1 January 1972, the municipality of Haltdalen was merged with the neighboring municipality of Ålen to form the new (present-day) municipality of Holtålen (resurrecting an old name for the area as the name of the new municipality). Prior to the merger, Haltdalen had 778 residents. On 21 April 1989, a small unpopulated part of the neighboring municipality of Røros was transferred to Holtålen. On 1 January 2018, the municipality switched from the old Sør-Trøndelag county to the new Trøndelag county.

Name
The municipality (originally the parish) is named after the local valley ( and later ). Historically, the spelling was Holtaalen, and in the 20th century the spelling was changed to the current Holtålen.

Coat of arms
The coat of arms was granted on 4 March 1988. The official blazon is "Gules, a grouse argent". This means the arms have a red field (background) and the charge is a willow ptarmigan (Lagopus lagopus) (a type of grouse). The ptarmigan has a tincture of argent which means it is commonly colored white, but if it is made out of metal, then silver is used. This common local bird was chosen to reflect the importance of hunting in the municipality. The arms were designed by Kari Vårhus Sagen.

Churches
The Church of Norway has three parishes within the municipality of Holtålen. It is part of the Gauldal prosti (deanery) in the Diocese of Nidaros.

Geography

At the village of Renbygda the deep Gauldalen valley disappears into the mountains, not far from the lake Riasten.

The western part of Holtålen is where the Forollhogna National Park is located with the mountain Forollhogna on the border with Midtre Gauldal municipality. The lake Øyungen lies just outside the park.

The Kjøli and Killingdal copper mines are located in the southeastern part of Holtålen. The last mine in production was Killingdal until it closed down in 1986.

Hessdalen is a mountain valley joining the Gauldal valley close to the village of Renbygda. Around 1983, Hessdalen became famous for UFO observations and the Hessdalen lights. Because of this the Hessdalen AMS station was founded in the valley.

The Rørosbanen railway line runs through the municipality, stopping at the Ålen Station and Haltdalen Station.

Government
All municipalities in Norway, including Holtålen, are responsible for primary education (through 10th grade), outpatient health services, senior citizen services, unemployment and other social services, zoning, economic development, and municipal roads. The municipality is governed by a municipal council of elected representatives, which in turn elect a mayor. The municipality falls under the Trøndelag District Court and the Frostating Court of Appeal.

Municipal council
The municipal council of Holtålen is made up of 15 representatives that are elected to four-year terms. The party breakdown of the council is as follows:

Mayor
The mayors of Holtålen:

1972–1975: Arne Wolden (Ap)
1976–1979: Olav Myran (Ap)
1980–1991: Håvard Moen (Ap)
1991–2011: Ivar Volden (Ap)
2011–2015: Heidi Greni (Sp)
2015–2019: Jan Håvard Refsethås (Sp)
2019–present: Arve Hitterdal (LL)

Notable people 
 Mons Lie (1757 in Ålen – 1827) a Norwegian police chief, writer and songwriter
 Hans Bull Brodtkorb Mohr (1886 in Haltdalen – 1973) an educator and international cooperation activist
 Anders Bjørgaard (1891 in Holtålen – 1967) a Norwegian illustrator of the comic series Jens von Bustenskjold
 Kåre Prytz (1926 in Ålen – 1994) a Norwegian journalist and novelist

References

External links

Municipal fact sheet from Statistics Norway 

 
Municipalities of Trøndelag
1972 establishments in Norway